Justin Micheal Bryant Thomas (born March 15, 1994) is an American football wide receiver who is currently a free agent. He played college football at Georgia Tech and signed with the New Orleans Saints as an undrafted free agent in 2017. He has also been a member of the Los Angeles Rams, Atlanta Legends, and DC Defenders. He is now Quarterbacks Coach of the Prattville Lions.

Early years
Thomas attended Prattville High School in Prattville, Alabama. He played football, basketball and baseball. He helped lead the Lions to win the Alabama class 6A state football championship in 2011. Rivals.com rated him as a four-star recruit in football. He originally committed the University of Alabama to play college football but changed to Georgia Tech. He made the change due to Georgia Tech offering him a chance to play quarterback. Alabama had indicated that he would be used as a defensive back.

College career
Thomas was redshirted for his freshman season at Georgia Tech in 2012. As a redshirt freshman in 2013, he played in 10 games as a backup to Vad Lee. He completed nine of 17 passes for 131 yards and one passing touchdown and rushed for 234 yards on 33 carries and two touchdowns. Thomas took over as the starter in 2014 after Lee transferred. He went on to start all 14 games including the Orange Bowl victory against Mississippi State led by Dak Prescott. He was named the MVP of the game after he had 125 passing yards, a passing touchdown, 121 rushing yards and three rushing touchdowns. For the season, he passed for 1,719 yards and 18 touchdowns with six interceptions and rushed for 1,086 yards and eight touchdowns. The 2015 season was one that was marred by injuries. The team finished with a dismal 3-9 record. Thomas' most notable performance of the season was against then undefeated Florida State. He rushed for a 60 yard touchdown that kept the Yellow Jackets in the game, making the score 10-13. The team moved on, and Thomas lead the way to an impressive 2016 season. He led the Yellow Jackets to wins over SEC teams Vanderbilt, Kentucky, and Georgia. Thomas had a historic game against Duke, passing for 264 yards and two touchdowns, and running for 195 yards and 2 more touchdowns.
The team went 9-4 on the season. Thomas is regarded as one of the best quarterbacks in Georgia Tech history.

College statistics

Year* 2012 – red shirt

Professional career

New Orleans Saints
Thomas signed with the New Orleans Saints as an undrafted free agent after participating in the team's rookie minicamp as a defensive back and wide receiver. He was waived on July 29, 2017.

Los Angeles Rams
On August 3, 2017, Thomas signed with the Los Angeles Rams. He was waived on August 18, 2017.

Pittsburgh Steelers
On August 23, 2017, Thomas was signed by the Pittsburgh Steelers. He was waived on September 2, 2017, and was then signed to the practice squad the next day. He was released on September 20, 2017, but re-signed six days later. He was released on October 18, 2017, but was re-signed on November 6. He was released again on November 20 and re-signed on December 21. He signed a reserve/future contract with the Steelers on January 16, 2018.

On August 27, 2018, Thomas was waived by the Steelers.

Atlanta Legends
For the 2019 AAF season, Thomas signed with the Atlanta Legends. He was waived on April 1, 2019.

DC Defenders
In October 2019, Thomas was picked by the DC Defenders as part of the 2020 XFL Draft's open phase. He was released during mini-camp in December 2019.

See also 

 List of Georgia Tech Yellow Jackets starting quarterbacks
 Georgia Tech Yellow Jackets football statistical leaders

References

External links
Georgia Tech Yellow Jackets bio
ESPN Profile

1994 births
Living people
Players of American football from Montgomery, Alabama
American football quarterbacks
Georgia Tech Yellow Jackets football players
New Orleans Saints players
Los Angeles Rams players
Pittsburgh Steelers players
Atlanta Legends players
DC Defenders players
People from Prattville, Alabama